Charles Caspar Simons (May 21, 1876 – February 2, 1964) was a United States circuit judge of the United States Court of Appeals for the Sixth Circuit and previously was a United States district judge of the United States District Court for the Eastern District of Michigan.

Education and career

Born in Detroit, Michigan, Simons received a Bachelor of Laws from the University of Michigan in 1898 and a second Bachelor of Laws from the University of Michigan Law School in 1900. He was in private practice in Detroit from 1900 to 1923, also serving as a member of the Michigan Senate from 1903 to 1904, a Circuit Court commissioner for Wayne County, Michigan from 1905 to 1906, and a member of the Michigan Constitutional Convention in 1908.

Federal judicial service

Simons was nominated by President Warren G. Harding on January 31, 1923, to the United States District Court for the Eastern District of Michigan, to a new seat authorized by 42 Stat. 837. He was confirmed by the United States Senate on February 6, 1923, and received his commission the same day. His service terminated on February 2, 1932, due to his elevation to the Sixth Circuit.

Simons was nominated by President Herbert Hoover on January 8, 1932, to a seat on the United States Court of Appeals for the Sixth Circuit vacated by Judge Arthur Carter Denison. He was confirmed by the Senate on January 26, 1932, and received his commission on January 29, 1932. He served as Chief Judge and as a member of the Judicial Conference of the United States from 1952 to 1958. He assumed senior status on September 15, 1959. His service terminated on February 2, 1964, due to his death.

References

Sources
 

1876 births
1964 deaths
Judges of the United States District Court for the Eastern District of Michigan
United States district court judges appointed by Warren G. Harding
Judges of the United States Court of Appeals for the Sixth Circuit
United States court of appeals judges appointed by Herbert Hoover
20th-century American judges
University of Michigan Law School alumni